John Avery may refer to:

Politics and law
John Avery (MP for Old Sarum) (1362–1397), MP for Old Sarum
John Avery (MP for Weymouth) (fl. 1393), MP for Weymouth
John Avery Jr. (1739–1806), American politician; first Massachusetts Secretary of the Commonwealth
John Avery (politician) (1824–1914), American physician and U.S. representative from Michigan
John Avery (lawyer) (born 1948), Australian barrister

Others
Henry Every (alias "John Avery", 1659–after 1699), English pirate
John Avery (organ builder) (c. 1755–1807), English organ builder
Skip Avery (John Thomas Avery, 1923–1990), American baseball player
John Avery (police officer) (1927–2018), Australian police commissioner
John Scales Avery (born 1933), American physicist and chemist
John Avery (gridiron football) (born 1976), American football player in the NFL and CFL
John Avery (journalist), Belizean public utilities commissioner and journalist

See also
Jack Avery (disambiguation)
Avery John (born 1975), soccer player from Trinidad & Tobago